The Sturgis and Haskell Building is a historic commercial building at 180-182 Water Street in downtown Augusta, Maine.  Built in 1867, it is one of a series of four Italianate commercial buildings built in the wake of a devastating 1865 fire. It was listed on the National Register of Historic Places in 1986.

Description and history
The Sturgis and Haskell Building stands on the west side of Water Street, Augusta's principal commercial downtown thoroughfare, at its southwest corner with Bridge Street.  It is the northernmost of a series of four three-story brick Italianate commercial buildings, running south from that corner, which share a common roof line.  The windows of #182 have round-arch headers, with a band of brick corbelling joining the arches.  A second brick corbel stringcourse separates the second and third floors.  The windows of #180 were originally like those of #182, but have been replaced by rectangular sash, and the rounded headers have been filled in.  The building has two storefronts facing Water Street, while the Bridge Street facade has blinded round arches.

All four of these buildings were built beginning in 1865, after a fire devastated Augusta's downtown.  This building was designed by John C. Tibbetts, Augusta's preeminent architect of the time, and was built for Ira Sturgis and Erastus Haskell.  It is the last of the building series to be completed.  The building continues to see commercial use.

See also
Noble Block, #186 Water Street
National Register of Historic Places listings in Kennebec County, Maine

References

Commercial buildings on the National Register of Historic Places in Maine
National Register of Historic Places in Augusta, Maine
Italianate architecture in Maine
Buildings and structures completed in 1867
Buildings and structures in Augusta, Maine